Laurens Serpe (born 7 February 2001) is an Italian professional footballer who plays as a defender for  club Imolese, on loan from Spezia.

Club career
Serpe made his debut for the senior squad of Genoa on 13 August 2021 as an added-time substitute in a Coppa Italia game against Perugia. He made his Serie A debut for Genoa on 21 August 2021 in a game against Inter Milan. He substituted Davide Biraschi at half-time of a 0–4 away loss.

On 17 January 2022, Serpe moved to Crotone in Serie B on loan.

On 8 July 2022, Serpe signed a four-year contract with Spezia. On 16 August 2022, Spezia loaned Serpe to Imolese.

International career
He was first called up to represent Italy in 2017 for under-17 friendlies.

Personal life
Born in Italy, he has two brothers (Ruben and Philip), some cousins and his mother is from the Netherlands.

References

External links
 

2001 births
Sportspeople from the Province of Massa-Carrara
Footballers from Tuscany
Living people
Italian people of Dutch descent
Italian footballers
Italy youth international footballers
Association football defenders
Genoa C.F.C. players
F.C. Crotone players
Spezia Calcio players
Imolese Calcio 1919 players
Serie A players